The Mujica Nava Ecological Station ( is (or was) an ecological station in the state of Rondônia, Brazil.
In 2010 it was incorporated into the Mapinguari National Park, but this decision was later challenged.

Location

It adjoins the border with the state of Amazonas and the Serra dos Três Irmãos Ecological Station.
It is drained by tributaries of the Madeira River.
It has similar fauna and flora to the neighboring Serra dos Três Irmãos ESEC.
The ESEC is almost entirely covered by open submontane rainforest.

History

The Antônio Mujica Nava Ecological Station was created by state governor decree 7635 of 7 November 1996 to be administered by SEDAM, the State Secretariat for Environmental Development.
Some of the Rio Vermelho State Forest was included in the Mujica Nava Ecological Station.
It is classed as IUCN protected area category Ia (strict nature reserve).

The boundaries of the Mapinguari National Park were modified by law 12249 of 11 June 2010 which added about  but excluded the area that would be flooded by the Jirau Dam to create the reservoir for the Jirau Hydroelectric Power Plant.
The added land had formerly been state conservation units, the Rio Vermelho State Forest (A and B), the Antônio Mugica Nava Ecological Station and part of the Serra dos Três Irmãos Ecological Station.
Law 12249 was challenged in July 2013 by the federal Attorney General on the basis of unconstitutionality.
This was followed by moves by the state legislature to annul creation of the state conservation units, which were in turn overturned.

Notes

Sources

Ecological stations of Brazil
Protected areas of Rondônia
1996 establishments in Brazil
Protected areas established in 1996